Phi Sigma is an honor society for students of biological sciences, formed at Ohio State University.

History
The Phi Sigma honor society was founded on March 17, 1915 at Ohio State University to honor excellence in biological research. In 1928 its constitution was so altered that the society "should now be considered as a working guild", with a focus on ongoing research.  The society now includes more broadly the field of the biological sciences.

Phi Sigma became a member of the Association of College Honor Societies in 1950.

In 1947, Phi Sigma became international, opening a chapter in Mexico City at the Universidad Nacional Autónoma de México. In 1949 it opened a second international chapter, entering the University of the Philippines in Manila.

Phi Sigma is reserved for students who have demonstrated interest in research, and are at the top of their class in their respective universities.  At least one-fourth of their college training should include biological sciences.

Chapters

The society reports 93 active chapters since 1915.

Traditions and insignia
The Greek letters, Phi and Sigma, signify "fellows in science".  The coat of arms contains the motto of the organization in Greek, which when translated means, "Truth shall spring from the earth."

Together, they signify FELLOWS IN SCIENCE. Fellowship in science includes ardent cooperative effort, effective leadership, and creative scholarship.

The flower of the society is the Shasta Daisy.

The colors of the society are Medium Green, White and Old Gold, taken from the colors of the Society's flower. 

The jewel of the society is the Pearl.

External links
 
Hermean/Phi Sigma Societies Collection (MUM00568) at the University of Mississippi, Archives and Special Collections.
 ACHS Phi Sigma entry
 Phi Sigma chapter list at ACHS

References

Association of College Honor Societies
Honor societies
Student organizations established in 1915
1915 establishments in Ohio